The 12th Annual Transgender Erotica Awards was a pornographic awards event recognizing the best in transgender pornography form the previous year from  November 16, 2018 – October 1, 2019. Pre-nominations were open from October 2 to October 16, 2019. The public-at-large was able to suggest nominees using an online form. Nominees were announced on January 3, 2020, online on the theteashow.com website, with fan voting opening on the same day. The eligibility period for the fan award was 1 January to 31 December 2019. The awards open to fan voting were the fan award which was open to all and site-specific awards which were open to members of the forums of the specific sites who met specific criteria regarding; a number of postings and a date to have been a member before. The winners were announced during the webcast on May 10, 2020.

Rescheduling of event
The TEA's were originally scheduled to be hosted by Domino Presley at the Avalon Hollywood of March 15, 2020. On March 12 as a result of legal advice following restriction in place on events in excess of 250 people being recommended to be cancelled by Governor of California Gavin Newsom, the event was indefinitely postponed, as a result of the Avalon cancelling all events in March 2020. On April 20, 2020, it was announced that the award show would be held as an online production, broadcast for free on grooby247.com. The awards were presented with winners notified in advance after signing non-disclosure agreements. Each winner gave a pre-recorded acceptance speech. Award trophies were mailed out to recipients after the award show was broadcast.

Winners and nominees
The nominations for the 12th Transgender Erotica Awards were announced online on January 3, 2020, and fan voting opened on the same day, when pre-nominations closed, online on the theteashow.com website. The originally scheduled to be announced during the awards on March 15, 2020, but were later publicly announced on May 10, 2020, during the pre-recorded webcast.

Awards
Winners are listed first, highlighted in boldface.

References

Transgender Erotica Awards
Pornographic film awards
21st-century awards
American pornographic film awards
Annual events in the United States
Awards established in 2008
Culture of Los Angeles
Adult industry awards